The Women's 4x100 metres relay event at the 2011 European Athletics U23 Championships was held in Ostrava, Czech Republic, at Městský stadion on 17 July.

Medalists

†: Competed only in heat.

Results

Final
17 July 2011 / 17:10

†:  ranked initially 1st (44.00), but was disqualified later for infringement of IAAF doping rules by team members Darya Pizhankova and Ulyana Lepska.

Heats
Qualified: First 3 in each heat (Q) and 2 best performers (q) advance to the Final

Summary

†:  initially reached the final (44.56), but was disqualified later for infringement of IAAF doping rules by team members Darya Pizhankova and Ulyana Lepska.

Details

Heat 1
17 July 2011 / 15:20

†:  initially reached the final (44.56), but was disqualified later for infringement of IAAF doping rules by team members Darya Pizhankova and Ulyana Lepska.

Heat 2
17 July 2011 / 15:27

Participation
According to an unofficial count, 37 athletes from 9 countries participated in the event.

References

4 x 100 metres relay
Relays at the European Athletics U23 Championships
2011 in women's athletics